The 1839 United States Senate election in Massachusetts was held on January 17 and 18, 1839. 

Incumbent Whig Senator Daniel Webster was easily re-elected to his third term in office.

At this time, Massachusetts elected U.S. senators by a majority of each house of the Massachusetts General Court.

Election

Senate vote
The Senate voted on January 17.

House election
The House voted on January 18.

Aftermath
Webster resigned his seat in 1841 to accept his appointment as Secretary of State by President William Henry Harrison. However, Webster left office in 1843 after President John Tyler pressured him to resign and was elected to this seat again in 1845.

References

1839
Massachusetts
United States Senate